Jared Montz (born December 26, 1982) is a retired American soccer player.

Professional career
Montz played college soccer at Lynn University for four years, where he finished with 5 goals and 16 assists in 67 matches. He helped lead the Lynn Fighting Knights to the 2003 NCAA Division II Men's Soccer Championship.

He signed with the Chicago Fire on April 15, 2005.  In 2006, he made his debut appearance and earned an assist, but was later waived during the off-season due to injury.  He subsequently signed for the Vancouver Whitecaps in the USL First Division. After making just one appearance for the Whitecaps, he transferred to the Puerto Rico Islanders in June 2007.

Montz ended his career early because of a recurring injury and announced his retirement from professional soccer on March 20, 2009.

Honors
Lynn Fighting Knights
 NCAA Division II Men's Soccer Championship (1): 2003

External links
Online Soccer Academy
Jared's Twitter page
Online Soccer Academy Youtube Channel

1982 births
Living people
People from Mandeville, Louisiana
American soccer players
Major League Soccer players
USL First Division players
USL League Two players
Lynn Fighting Knights men's soccer players
New Orleans Shell Shockers players
Chicago Fire FC players
Vancouver Whitecaps (1986–2010) players
Puerto Rico Islanders players
Soccer players from Louisiana
Association football defenders